Herbert IV of Vermandois (1028–1080), Count of Vermandois, was the son of Otto of Vermandois and Parvie (Pavia or Patia).

Family and children
Herbert married Adele of Valois, daughter of Ralph IV of Valois and Adele of Bar-sur-Aube. They had:
 Adelaide, Countess of Vermandois, (b. Circa 1062 - d. September 23, 1120) - married first to  Hugh Magnus, son of Henry I of France and younger brother of Philip I of France, and second to Renaud II, Count of Clermont-Beauvaisis. 
 Odo I, Count of Vermandois (b. circa 1064 - d. after 1085)
 Gerard (b. 1066 - d. ?)

Adelaide's husband, Hugh, inherited the countships of Vermandois and Valois upon Herbert's death.

Notes

References

Sources

External links
Medieval Lands Project on Heribert IV, Count of Vermandois

Counts of Vermandois
Herbertien dynasty
1028 births
1080 deaths